Optional Practical Training (OPT) is a period during which undergraduate and graduate students with F-1 status who have completed or have been pursuing their degrees for one academic year are permitted by the United States Citizenship and Immigration Services (USCIS) to work for one year on a student visa towards getting practical training to complement their education. Foreign students currently enrolled at a U.S. university can receive full-time or part-time work authorization through Curricular Practical Training. In 2021, there were 115,651 new non-STEM OPT authorizations, a 105% increase from a decade ago. According to Pew Research, there were 441,400 OPT approvals from India and 313,500 from China between 2004-2016.

On April 2, 2008, the U.S. Department of Homeland Security (DHS) Secretary Michael Chertoff announced a 17-month extension to the OPT for students in qualifying STEM fields. To be eligible for the 12-month permit, any degree in any field of studies is valid. For the 17-month OPT extension, a student must have received a science, technology, engineering, or mathematics degree as defined by USCIS.

On March 11, 2016, the Department of Homeland Security published a final rule allowing certain F-1 students who receive STEM degrees and who meet other specified requirements to apply for a 24-month extension of their post-completion OPT, giving STEM graduates a total of 36 months of OPT. The 24-month extension replaces the 17-month STEM OPT extension previously available to STEM students (see 73 FR 18944). Eligible students could apply for a 24-month STEM OPT extension starting on May 10, 2016. In 2019, there were 72,116 new STEM OPT authorizations. Compared to a decade prior, it is an 1108% increase. In the same year, there were 78,000 STEM OPT workers from India and 30,000 workers from China.

There also exists a post-completion Optional Practical Training option for students on M-1 visas, but it is significantly more restrictive than that for F-1 students. Unless otherwise specified, Optional Practical Training is understood to refer to Optional Practical Training for F-1 students.

OPT Employment Authorization Statistics 
One place to look for statistics on yearly OPT authorizations is Immigration and Customs Enforcement. In 2021, there were 115,651 new OPT authorizations, a 105% increase from a decade ago.

In 2019, there were 72,116 new STEM OPT authorizations. Compared to a decade prior, it is an 1108% increase.

OPT Approvals & Denials from 2008-2013 

The Government Accountability Office published a report in 2014 with information on OPT approvals and denials from fiscal year 2008-2013. Note that the counts here are of receipts, approvals, denials or revocations that happened in the fiscal year, regardless of when other activities surrounding that application occurred. For instance, if an application was approved in Fiscal Year 2009 and revoked in Fiscal Year 2010, the revocation would be counted in 2010 rather than 2009. Thus, the number of receipts for a given year need not equal the sum of the number of approvals and denials for that year. The approval rate for OPT petitions between 2008 and 2013 was 96%.

Number of OPT Students by Country 

Another place to find statistics on optional practical training is from the Institute of International Education. The organization maintains data on the number of international students as part of its Open Doors project, supported from a grant by the Bureau of Educational and Cultural Affairs in the U.S. Department of State. The data is collected through surveys of over 3,000 accredited U.S. higher education institutions, and does not rely on any privileged access to government data; in particular institutions not included in the survey (such as high schools that issue student visas, and non-accredited institutions that are SEVP-certified) may be omitted from the statistics. Since the 2006–2007 academic year, these surveys have included data on usage of the Optional Practical Training program.

Since the Optional Practical Training program duration is a year for most people (though the STEM extension and cap gap allow for longer OPTs under some circumstances), the number of approvals in a given year should roughly match the number of students on Optional Practical Training. However, because of various mismatches such as that between the fiscal and academic year, and between the date of approval and the start date, and the fact that the Open Doors survey does not cover all SEVP-certified institutions, the numbers may not exactly match those from the GAO table.

The data below summarizes both total OPT usage and the usage based on country of origin for the top countries of origin. More detailed data is available at the IIE website.

History

Creation of OPT 
The first Bush administration created Optional Practical Training on July 20, 1992. The Justice Department created the program without public comment or notice. The 1990 Immigration Act originally created a time-limited employment pilot program for foreign students on visas.

Introduction of the STEM OPT Extension 

The STEM extension was announced in a memo by Department of Homeland Security Secretary Michael Chertoff on April 2, 2008, published in the Federal Register issue of Tuesday, April 8, 2008. The STEM extension appears to be directly attributable to Congressional testimony by Microsoft co-founder Bill Gates, March 12, 2008.

Challenge from Immigration Reform Law Institute in 2008 
The OPT STEM extension announced in April 2008 was challenged in a lawsuit by the Immigration Reform Law Institute filed on May 31, 2008. The organization filed a lawsuit in federal court on behalf of various organizations and individuals challenging the validity of the 17-month OPT extension. On August 5, 2008, the lawsuit was rejected by a New Jersey district court judge.

Obama Administration Changes 

A November 20, 2014 memo by Department of Homeland Security Secretary Jeh Charles Johnson outlining proposed executive action on immigration endorsed by President Barack Obama included some suggested changes to the OPT program. The proposals were discussed and critiqued in National Law Review.

Challenge in November 2014 

In August 2015, a US federal court gave the green light to a lawsuit challenging the 17-month OPT STEM extension, filed by the Washington Alliance of Technology Workers and three IT workers who claimed that the OPT STEM extension had created unfair low-wage competition that had materially hurt them.

On August 12, 2015, the United States District Court for the District of Columbia vacated the 2008 OPT Regulations but stayed the order until February 12, 2016, later extended to May 10, 2016, to allow DHS to provide a transition. The court therefore gave the federal government a deadline and an extension to formulate new rules. The D.C. District explicitly rejected the reasoning of the New Jersey District and Third Circuit in dismissing the earlier 2008 challenge.

New STEM OPT Extension Rule in 2016 

The proposed rules suggested in the November 20, 2014 memo by DHS Secretary Jeh Johnson were finalized by the USCIS on March 11, 2016, to be effective May 10, 2016, just in time to address the November 2014 court challenge to the original STEM extension. USCIS expanded the STEM extension to two years. The agency did add a requirement that the employer attest to the non-displacement of U.S. workers, to address concerns raised in the STEM extension lawsuit challenge.

April and May 2020: Trump administration proposals to limit OPT 

In April and May 2020, in response to the COVID-19 pandemic and the increase in unemployment due to the pandemic and associated government lockdowns, the administration of President Donald Trump was reported to be exploring new restrictions on OPT, with the possibility that some of the measures may be targeted specifically at Chinese students.

Criticism

Cheap Labor 
Labor experts have noted that employers like to hire foreign workers on OPT because employers get a discount. Students working with OPT authorization do not pay Social Security and Medicare taxes. For employers, hiring an OPT worker amounts to a 15.3% discount per student compared to an American citizen or permanent resident.

Lack of Congressional Authorization 
Policy scholars and detractors of OPT have noted that Congress never provided F-1 visa foreign students the ability to work besides a three-year pilot program included in the Immigration Act of 1990 that ended.

Internal Brain Drain 
Journalists have pointed out that foreign STEM OPT recipients drive American STEM graduates and future STEM students away from industry through wage deflation and competition for entry-level jobs.

Lack of Government Oversight 
Some have criticized the OPT program because of a lack of government oversight. By design, only school officials review student practical training plans.

Visa Mills 
Some have critiqued the OPT program for incentivizing academic institutions to focus on international over American students. The incentive for many foreign students is to obtain work authorization in the United States.

Employer Abuse of Foreign Students

National Security Risk & Theft 
Lawmakers have expressed concerns that vulnerabilities in the work authorization program expose the United States to foreign theft of intellectual property, especially from China.

Fraud 
There are concerns about fraud with the program. An investigation by NBC News found that fake companies were exploiting the foreign student guestworker program. These companies created fraudulent employment documents so foreign graduates could stay in the United States illegally. Companies such as Tellon Trading and Findream, employing 1,200 OPT graduates total in 2017, were the only companies on paper.

Another Guest Worker Program 
Labor experts have noted how the optional practical training is primarily a guestworker program, not an educational one.

References

External links
 Title 8 CFR: Title 8 Code of Federal Regulations.
 I-765: Form I-765
 April 2008 extension notice
 USCIS: OPT FAQs

Employment of foreign-born
Education in the United States